Gerrit Jansz de Heere (1 March 1657 – 26 November 1702) was a Governor of Dutch Ceylon during its Dutch period.

Biography 
De Heere was the son of Johan Gerritsz de Heere and Marritje Gerrits. From 1693 until 1694, he served as Chief Trader at Dejima, after which he became a senior merchant in Batavia, capital of the Dutch East Indies. In 1695, he married Johanna Maria van Riebeeck, who was 22 years his junior and a daughter of Abraham van Riebeeck as well as a granddaughter to Jan van Riebeeck, founder of Cape Town.

De Heere was appointed Governor of Dutch Ceylon on 22 February 1697, which he remained until his death on 26 November 1702. He was succeeded by Cornelis Jan Simonsz.

Footnotes

External links 
 

1657 births
1702 deaths
17th-century Dutch colonial governors
Dutch chiefs of factory in Japan
Governors of Dutch Ceylon
Dutch East India Company people from Amsterdam